The 1978 William & Mary Tribe football team represented the College of William & Mary as an independent during the 1978 NCAA Division I-A football season. Led by Jim Root in his seventh year as head coach, William & Mary finished the season with a record of 5–5–1.

Schedule

References

William and Mary
William & Mary Tribe football seasons
William and Mary Indians football